Elzo Aloísio Coelho (born 22 January 1961), better known as Elzo, is a retired Brazilian footballer who played for the national team, a number of Brazilian clubs and Portuguese Benfica.

Playing career
Elzo made 87 appearances in the Campeonato Brasileiro, most of them for Atlético Mineiro. He then played in Benfica. At the 1987–88 European Cup his squad lost the final to PSV Eindhoven after a penalty shoot-out. In the second season he became Portuguese champion. Upon returning home, he joined Palmeiras. Elzo was capped eleven times for Brazil, all between March and June 1986. He played Brazil's all five games at the 1986 FIFA World Cup finals.

Honours
Ginásio Pinhalense
Campeonato Paulista: 1979

Internacional
Campeonato Gaúcho: 1982, 1983 and 1984

Atlético Mineiro
Campeonato Mineiro: 1985 and 1986

Benfica
Portuguese Liga: 1988–89
European Cup: Runner-up 1987–88

Individual
Bola de Prata brasileiro (Placar) 1989 (Palmeiras)

References

1961 births
Living people
Sportspeople from Minas Gerais
Brazilian footballers
Associação Atlética Internacional (Limeira) players
Sport Club Internacional players
Clube Atlético Mineiro players
S.L. Benfica footballers
Sociedade Esportiva Palmeiras players
Associação Atlética Caldense players
Campeonato Brasileiro Série A players
Primeira Liga players
Brazilian expatriate footballers
Brazilian expatriate sportspeople in Portugal
Expatriate footballers in Portugal
1986 FIFA World Cup players
Brazil international footballers
Association football midfielders